The International Association of Lighting Designers (IALD) is a learned society of architectural lighting designers founded in 1969 and based in Chicago.

History
In 1969, a group of lighting designers—including Ray Grenald—established the International Association of Lighting Designers. At that time, all existing industry organizations were primarily focused on the science and engineering of lighting rather than the aesthetic design.

One of the founding designers was Lesley Wheel. Originally trained in theatrical lighting design, Wheel had become the first woman to start a career in architectural lighting design. She later served as president of the IALD, and remained a fellow until her death in 2004.

Partnerships
The IALD has partnered with the Illuminating Engineering Society (IES), the Alliance to Save Energy (ASE), and the United States Department of Energy (DOE) to promote sustainable lighting. The IALD also maintains partnerships with the IES, the American Institute of Architects (AIA), the International Commission on Illumination (CIE), Institution of Lighting Professionals (ILP), the National Electrical Manufacturers Association (NEMA), and other professional organizations to promote the industry and develop technical standards.

Lobbying
On May 26, 2009, the IALD called upon its members to voice their disapproval of bill set for a vote the following day in the Texas House of Representatives.  A last-minute amendment to Texas House Bill 2649 would have required licensure (i.e. as an engineer, architect, landscape architect, or interior designer) to offer lighting-design services directly to the public in Texas. The proposed legislation was successfully defeated.

International Lighting Design Awards
The IALD International Lighting Design Awards (IALD awards) is an award for architectural lighting bestowed since 1983 by the International Association of Lighting Designers.

Awards of Excellence and Awards of Merit

Special Citation

See also

Notable members

 Kaoru Mende

Related organizations
 Chartered Institution of Building Services Engineers (CIBSE)
 Professional Lighting Designers' Association (PLDA)

References

External links
 

Architectural lighting design
Lighting organizations
Learned societies of the United States